Ilya Nikolayevich Ulyanov (– ) was a Russian public figure in the field of public education. He was the father of revolutionary Vladimir Lenin, who became a Bolshevik leader and founder of the Soviet Union, and Aleksandr Ulyanov, who was executed for his attempt to assassinate Tsar Alexander III in 1886.

Life
Ilya Ulyanov was born in Astrakhan. His father was Nikolai Vasilievich Ulyanov (or Ulyanin; 1765–1838), a port-city tailor and a former serf of possible Chuvash, Mordvinian, Russian or Kalmyk descent, who came from Sergachsky District, Nizhny Novgorod Governorate. He received his freedom from a landowner, Stepan Mikhailovich Brekhov. Ilya's mother, Anna Alexeyevna Smirnova (1793–1871), was half-Kalmyk, half-Russian and the daughter of city-dweller Alexei Lukyanovich Smirnov, a son of Lukyan Smirnov. Nikolai married 30-year-old Anna in 1823. Ilya had three sisters and a brother.

Ulyanov graduated from Kazan University's Department of Physics and Mathematics in 1854. In the 1850s and 1860s, he taught mathematics and physics at Penza Institute for the Dvoryane, and later at a gymnasium and a school for women in Nizhny Novgorod. Around that time, he married Maria Alexandrovna Blank. While at Penza, Ulyanov conducted meteorological observations, the basis on which he would write several scientific works.

In 1869, Ulyanov was appointed inspector of public schools in the Simbirsk guberniya (in 1874-1886 he was their director). In 1882, Ulyanov was promoted to the rank of Active State Councillor, which gave him a privilege of hereditary nobility and accompanied by the award of the Order of Saint Vladimir, 3rd Class.
  
Ulyanov was a well-educated man with excellent organizational and teaching skills. Some Soviet historians believed that his pedagogical views had been formed under the influence of the revolutionary ideas of Nikolai Chernyshevsky and Nikolai Dobrolyubov. Ulyanov contributed immensely to the elaboration of the theory and practice of elementary education. He was an advocate of equal rights for education regardless of gender, nationality and social status. Others, such as Tony Cliff, dispute this image (arguing that this was a posthumous Stalinist attempt to improve the reputation of Lenin's family), saying in his biography of Lenin, 'Nikolaevich's standing in the Ministry of Education, and his steady rise up the hierarchical ladder, somehow do not fit the image of a revolutionary, or even a radical.' In 1871, Ulyanov opened the first Chuvash school in Simbirsk, which would later be transformed into Chuvash teacher's seminar. He also established national schools for Mordvins and Tatars. Furthermore, Ulyanov organized and presided over many teachers' congresses and other similar events. 

In 1886, Ulyanov died of a brain hemorrhage while in Simbirsk, which was later renamed Ulyanovsk in honor of his son.

Family
 Maria Alexandrovna Ulyanova, married 1863. Eight children, out of which two died as infants.
 Anna (1864–1935)
 Aleksandr (1866–1887)
 Olga (1868–1869)
 Vladimir (1870–1924)
 Olga (1871–1891)
 Nikolai (1873–1873)
 Dmitri (1874–1943)
 Maria (1878–1937)

References

External links

1831 births
1886 deaths
People from Astrakhan
People from Astrakhan Governorate
Schoolteachers from the Russian Empire
Family of Vladimir Lenin
Recipients of the Order of St. Vladimir, 3rd class
Russian untitled nobility